The 2005–06 season was the 120th season in the history of Luton Town Football Club, and the club's 85th consecutive year in the Football League. This was the club's first season in the second tier of English football since the 1995–96 season.

Mike Newell's Luton side made a strong start to the season, topping the table after the first three games and staying in the play-off places until mid-December. However, a poor second half to the season saw Luton eventually slip down the table to finish in tenth place, albeit above more-fancied sides such as Southampton and Leicester City. Striker Steve Howard was Luton's top goalscorer for the fifth season running, scoring 15 goals in total, despite playing parts of the campaign as a makeshift centre-back following injuries to most of the Luton defence. Indeed, this proved a common occurrence throughout the season, with Luton's relatively small squad forcing team members to play out of position when injuries or suspensions materialised.

Kenilworth Road was expanded at the beginning of the season to accommodate over 700 more fans and, combined with the large away followings of clubs such as Leeds United, Norwich City and Wolverhampton Wanderers, this saw the highest average attendance for Luton since their relegation from the top division in the 1991–92 season.

This article covers the period from 1 July 2005 to 30 June 2006.

Background
The 2004–05 season had seen Luton promoted to the second tier of English football, winning the League One title with 98 points and both the most goals scored and fewest goals conceded. Six Luton players had been named in the Team of the Year, with 20-year-old centre-back Curtis Davies being named League One Player of the Year. Key players Sol Davis, Kevin Nicholls, Ahmet Brković and Steve Howard had all agreed contract extensions with the club in the face of transfer speculation, while squad players Lee Mansell and David Bayliss had been released.

Review

July and August
Wrexham's Trinidad and Tobago international winger Carlos Edwards joined Luton on a free transfer on 1 July. The club released utility player Alan Neilson and long-term injured defender Ian Hillier the same day. On 4 July, Luton signed Rowan Vine on a three-year contract from Portsmouth for £250,000. Vine had spent the previous season on a year-long loan at Luton, playing in 49 games.

The club began pre-season with a mini-tournament in Bulgaria, losing to Bulgarian champions CSKA Sofia, and drawing with Cypriot Second Division club APEP. A day after returning to England, the club signed Aberdeen's Finnish international defender Markus Heikkinen and Reading forward Dean Morgan on free transfers. Both Heikkinen and Morgan signed two-year contracts. Young striker Calvin Andrew joined League Two club Grimsby Town on loan for a month on 4 August.

Luton began their season on 6 August with a 2–1 away win to recently relegated Crystal Palace, with Steve Howard and Ahmet Brković scoring, and captain Kevin Nicholls uncharacteristically missing a penalty. After the game, Luton manager Mike Newell reacted to comments in the Crystal Palace match programme that had suggested the game would be Luton's "cup final". Newell stated that "I do not expect to read condescending comments from fellow professionals." Three days later, Luton beat another side just relegated from the Premier League, winning 3–2 against Southampton at Kenilworth Road. New signing Dean Morgan scored the winning goal in stoppage-time. A 0–0 home draw with Leeds United was followed a week later with a 2–1 defeat to Stoke City in which Steve Howard was sent off for spitting at Carl Hoefkens. Howard received a three-game ban after Luton's appeal was rejected.

The club progressed into the second round of the League Cup with a 3–1 win over Leyton Orient on 23 August. Luton won their third league game on 27 August, Ahmet Brković scoring a bicycle kick and Kevin Nicholls a penalty to secure victory over Leicester City.

Luton were close to signing Ghanaian international midfielder Anthony Obodai from Ajax during the month, but the move fell through on 28 August due to complications with his visa.

Warren Feeney scored his first Luton goal in a 2–1 home victory against Millwall on 29 August to put Luton into third position in the table. Defender Curtis Davies scored the other goal in what would prove to be his last game in a Luton shirt; on 31 August, transfer deadline day, Davies moved to Premier League side West Bromwich Albion for a fee of £3 million – both a Luton and West Brom record in terms of money received and spent respectively. Midfielder Michael Leary moved to Bristol Rovers on a one-month loan the same day.

September and October
Luton drew 1–1 at home to title favourites Wolverhampton Wanderers on 10 September, Kevin Nicholls scoring a late goal, and then lost 1–0 to Queens Park Rangers three days later for their second defeat of the season. A 1–0 win over Hull City came on 17 September, followed by a 2–2 draw with Sheffield Wednesday a week later. Steve Howard scored all three of Luton's goals. In between these two league games, Luton lost 1–0 to Reading in the League Cup. Luton ended the month with an impressive 3–0 win over the previous season's play-off finalists Preston North End to sit in third place in the table, drawing praise from Preston manager Billy Davies. Midfielder Kevin Nicholls won the Championship's Player of the Month award for his performances.

The club beat Cardiff City 2–1 at Ninian Park on 1 October, midfielder Peter Holmes scoring one goal and setting up another. Bottom-of-the-table Crewe Alexandra beat Luton 3–1 on 15 October, but the club bounced back a few days later to defeat Norwich City 4–2 and return to their almost customary third place in the table. Plymouth Argyle scored a stoppage-time equaliser to deny Luton a win on 22 August, and the club then lost their fourth league game a week later, going down 1–0 at Coventry City.

Off the field, Luton loaned out youth player Thomas Ward to Dagenham & Redbridge, midfielder Stephen O'Leary to Tranmere Rovers, and Calvin Andrew for a second spell at Grimsby Town.

November and December
On 1 November, chairman Bill Tomlins announced that the club had changed its plans to build a new stadium near to Junction 10 of the M1 motorway, after being told the site would not be viable if Luton Airport was to earn permission to build a new runway. Instead, the owners began exploring the possibility of building a new stadium in time for the 2008–09 season near to Junction 12 – almost six miles away from their existing home of Kenilworth Road. Manager Mike Newell exhibited the first signs of a strained relationship with the club's board, criticising the lack of direction from the owners and stating that "[the owners] have been in 18 months, so why has it taken them 18 months to find out they can't build a stadium at Junction 10?"

The club lost three consecutive matches against Sheffield United (0–4), Burnley (2–3) and Norwich City (0–2) through early to mid-November, pushing them down the table to seventh place. Luton then beat Crewe Alexandra 4–1 and Crystal Palace 2–0, their ninth and tenth wins of the season, to end November in fifth position in the table. The club loaned out reserve goalkeeper Dino Seremet to League One club Doncaster Rovers for a month on 24 November.

Luton won just one of their six league games throughout December, pushing them out of the play-off positions, which they would not return to for the rest of the season. A heavy loss to leaders Reading on 3 December was followed up with narrow defeats to Southampton and Stoke City. A 1–1 draw on Boxing Day at Derby County was trailed by a 3–0 victory over strugglers Brighton & Hove Albion two days later. The club then lost 1–0 to Ipswich Town on New Year's Eve to drop to tenth in the table.

Match results
Luton Town results given first. 
All results, goals, attendances etc. taken from Soccerbase and verified with match reports from LutonFC.com.

Legend

Friendlies

Football League Championship

FA Cup

Football League Cup

League table

Player statistics
Last match played on 30 April 2006. Players with a zero in every column appeared either as unused substitutes or were assigned squad numbers.

Managerial statistics
Only competitive games from the 2005–06 season are included.

Awards
Awarded on 23 April 2006.

Transfers

In

Out

Loans out

See also
List of Luton Town F.C. seasons

Footnotes

A.  The Special Achievement Award went to Steve Howard for scoring his 100th goal for Luton Town during the season.
B.  The goal of the season was awarded to Dean Morgan for his 25-yard curling shot in the final minute of Luton's 3–2 win against Southampton on 9 August 2005.

References

Luton Town F.C. seasons
Luton Town